The 1957–58 Montreal Canadiens season was the club's 49th season of play. The Canadiens won their third-straight Stanley Cup and the tenth in club history.

Regular season
 October 19, 1957 – Maurice Richard scores a goal at 15:52 of the first period. Richard becomes the first player to score 500 goals in a career.
 Hockey's color barrier was broken in Montreal. Midway through his second minor-league season with the Quebec Aces, Willie O'Ree was called up to the Boston Bruins of the NHL to replace an injured player. O'Ree made his NHL debut with the Bruins on January 18, 1958, against the Montreal Canadiens, becoming the first black player in league history.

Record vs. opponents

Final standings

Schedule and results

Playoffs
In the semi-finals, Montreal played third place Detroit. After Detroit traded Ted Lindsay because of his union efforts, Detroit was a team in disarray. Montreal defeated the Red Wings in four straight games to reach the finals.

Stanley Cup Finals

Rocket Richard, was the top goal scorer during the playoffs with 11. In game five he notched his third final series overtime goal of his career and sixth playoff overtime goal of his career.

Boston Bruins vs. Montreal Canadiens

Montreal wins best-of-seven series 4 games to 2

Player statistics

Regular season
Scoring

Goaltending

Playoffs
Scoring

Goaltending

Awards and records

Transactions

See also
 1957–58 NHL season
 List of Stanley Cup champions

References
Canadiens on Hockey Database
Canadiens on NHL Reference

Stanley Cup championship seasons
Montreal Canadiens seasons
Mon
Mon